Manegold or Manegoldo may refer to:

Given name
Manegold of Lautenbach (c. 1030 – c. 1103), Alsatian philosopher
Manegold of Mammern (d. 1133), abbot of Saint Gall
Manegoldo del Tettuccio (fl. 1191), podestàa of Genoa
Manegold of Berg (d. 1215), bishop of Passau

Last name
Albrecht Manegold (born 1974), German ornithologist and paleontologist
Charles Manegold Jr. (b. 1851), American brewer

See also
Mangold
Mengold